The 2015–16 Girona FC season was the club's 86th season in existence and the eighth consecutive season in the second division of Spanish football. In addition to the domestic league, Girona participated in this season's edition of the Copa del Rey. The season covered the period from 1 July 2015 to 30 June 2016.

Players

First-team squad

Youth players

Out on loan

Transfers

In

Out

Pre-season and friendlies

Competitions

Overview

Segunda División

League table

Results summary

Results by round

Matches
The fixtures were revealed on 14 July 2015.

Play-offs

Copa del Rey

Statistics

Goalscorers

References

Girona FC seasons
Girona FC